George A. Pastushok (July 13, 1922 – December 12, 2003) was an American professional basketball player. He spent one season in the Basketball Association of America as a member of the Providence Steam Rollers in 1946–47. He attended St. John's University.

BAA career statistics

Regular season

External links
 

1922 births
2003 deaths
American Basketball League (1925–1955) players
American men's basketball players
Basketball players from New York City
Guards (basketball)
Providence Steamrollers players
Sportspeople from Queens, New York
St. John's Red Storm men's basketball players